Gourna may refer to;

 a dance performed by the Tupuri people of Cameroon and Chad
 Kurna or Gourna, three village areas located near the Theban Hills in Egypt

See also
 Gournay (disambiguation)